Dultsevka is a rural locality (a village) in Urmiyazovsky Selsoviet, Askinsky District, Bashkortostan, Russia. The population was 26 as of 2010. There is 1 street.

Geography 
Dultsevka is located 35 km east of Askino (the district's administrative centre) by road. Urshady is the nearest rural locality.

References 

Rural localities in Askinsky District